The siege of Alès was undertaken by Louis XIII of France, and the city captured on 17 June 1629.

The siege
The siege of Alès followed the disastrous capitulation of the main Protestant stronghold of La Rochelle, in the siege of La Rochelle. Huguenot resistance persisted in the south of France though, and Louis XIII endeavoured to eliminate it as well. With Privas and Anduze, the city of Alès was at the center of a string of Protestants strongholds in the Languedoc, stretching from Nîmes and Uzès in the east, to Castres and Montauban in the west. Alès was selected by Antoine Hercule de Budos, Marquis des Portes (1589-1629), as a strategic target to sever Huguenot defenses in two and disconnect their main centers of Nîmes and Montauban.

After Privas fell on 28 May 1629, in which the Marquis des Portes was killed, French attention turned to Alès. After an intense siege, the city surrendered on 17 June. At the end of the siege, Henri, Duke of Rohan, the leader of the Huguenot rebellion, submitted.

Aftermath

The remaining Huguenot cities rapidly fell, and finally Montauban surrendered without resistance. This was one of the last events in the repression of the Huguenot rebellions in France.

The siege was followed by the Peace of Alès (27 September 1629), which settled the revolt by guaranteeing the practice of the Huguenot religion and judicial protection, but requiring Huguenot strongholds as well as political assemblies to be dismantled.

See also
 French Wars of Religion
 Huguenot rebellions

Notes

1629 in France
Sieges involving France
Conflicts in 1629
Huguenot rebellions
Battles in Occitanie
History of Gard